Omar Ayuso (born 26 March 1998) is a Spanish actor. He is best known for his role as Omar Shanaa on the television series Elite (2018–present).

Early life and education 
Ayuso was born in Madrid on 26 March 1998 and raised in Manzanares el Real. After seeing Bad Education as a child, he became interested in becoming an actor or filmmaker. Ayuso studies audiovisual communication at the Charles III University of Madrid.

Career 
In 2018, Ayuso was cast in the Spanish web television series Elite as Omar Shanaa, a closeted gay Muslim who develops a relationship with Ander Muñoz who is played by Arón Piper. In preparation for the role, Ayuso worked for two months with director Ramón Salazar to absorb his character's role. 

In 2019, Ayuso starred in three short films including Maras’ de Salvador Calvo and Ráfagas de vida salvaje by Jorge Cantos and Disseminare by Jools Beardon.

In January 2020, Ayuso was featured in the music video of "Juro Que" by Spanish singer-songwriter Rosalía.

Ayuso plays the character, David, in the upcoming film, 8 Años, a gay drama where he reflects on an eight-year relationship.

Public image 
Ayuso and Piper's onscreen relationship, coined "Omander", and offscreen friendship has generated a global following. , he had over four million followers on social media. The role has boosted LGBT visibility although Ayuso resists the notion that he serves as a role model. As a gay man, Ayuso has been the subject of homophobic commentary. He believes the widespread support for his onscreen relationship with Piper is due to it being easier for homophobic people to accept gay people in fiction rather than in real life.

Ayuso has had a transgressive image which includes provocative fashion choices in public appearances and social media posts.

Personal life 
Ayuso has a tattoo of a flame and an eye on his hand inspired by Spanish artist Ricardo Cavolo. He identifies as gay and has stated that he is proud of his generation's social progress on topics including feminism, LGBT rights and efforts against racism.

Ayuso cites Spanish-Mexican singer Alaska as one of his idols.

, Ayuso is in a relationship with artist Alonso Díaz.

Filmography

Films

Short films

TV series

Music videos

References

External links 
 

Living people
1998 births
Male actors from Madrid
21st-century Spanish male actors
Male web series actors
Charles III University of Madrid alumni
Spanish gay actors
21st-century Spanish LGBT people
Spanish people of Moroccan descent
Spanish Muslims